Even Eriksen (born 7 July 1995) is a Norwegian politician.

He was elected deputy representative to the Storting from the constituency of Hedmark for the period 2021–2025, for the Labour Party. He replaced Anette Trettebergstuen in the Storting from 2021 while Trettebergstuen is government minister.

Hailing from Trysil, Eriksen has been member of the municipal council of Trysil since 2015, and of the county council of Innlandet since 2019. He graduated in jurisprudence from the University of Oslo.

References

1995 births
Living people
People from Trysil
University of Oslo alumni
Labour Party (Norway) politicians
Hedmark politicians
Members of the Storting